Wu Zhaohua (born: September 9, 1998) is a professional wushu taolu athlete from China.

Career 
Wu began to practice wushu at the game of seven. He later joined the Jiangsu Wushu Team to train under Wang Zhengtian.

Wu's first major intentional debut was at the 2016 Asian Wushu Championships in Taoyuan, Taiwan, where he became the Asian champion in men's changquan. A year later, he competed in the 2017 National Games of China and won the silver medal in men's changquan all-around. Near the end of the same year, he won the championship title of the King of Kings Wushu Championship. He then competed in the 2018 Asian Games in Jakarta, Indonesia, where he won the gold medal in men's daoshu and gunshu. A year later, Wu competed at the 2019 World Wushu Championships in Shanghai, China, and won the first gold medal of the competition which was in the men's daoshu event. He also competed with the rest of the China wushu team in the group-set (jiti) event and won another gold medal.

At the 2021 National Games of China, the first major wushu competition since the beginning of the COVID-19 pandemic, Wu won the gold medal in men's changquan all-around.

Competitive history

See also 

 List of Asian Games medalists in wushu
 China national wushu team

References

External links 

 Athlete profile at the 2018 Asian Games
 Daoshu performance at the 2019 World Wushu Championships

1998 births
Living people
Chinese wushu practitioners
Sportspeople from Jiangsu
Asian Games medalists in wushu
Asian Games gold medalists for China
Medalists at the 2018 Asian Games
Wushu practitioners at the 2018 Asian Games
Lanzhou University alumni
Competitors at the 2022 World Games
World Games gold medalists
World Games medalists in wushu
21st-century Chinese people